Forward Swindon Ltd. was established in 2010, by Swindon Borough Council to regenerate Swindon and deliver economic growth. Forward Swindon is a limited company, who are funded by the Council. Wound up in 2018/19.

Personnel

References

2010 establishments in England